Hoseynabad-e Dardan (also Romanized as Ḩoseynābād-e Dārdān; also known as Ḩoseynābād and Ḩoseynābād-e Dārdūn) is a village in Dorudzan Rural District, Dorudzan District, Marvdasht County, Fars Province, Iran. At the 2006 census, its population was 72, in 15 families.

References 

Populated places in Marvdasht County